Anarsia geminella is a moth in the family Gelechiidae. It was described by Hans Georg Amsel in 1967. It is found in Afghanistan.

References

geminella
Moths described in 1967
Moths of Asia